Shahrak-e Gachgaran (also Romanized as Shahrak-e Gachgarān) is a village in Bakesh-e Yek Rural District, in the Central District of Mamasani County, Fars Province, Iran. At the 2006 census, its population was 428, in 99 families.

References 

Populated places in Mamasani County